Hinckley United F.C. have played in the Non League Pyramid since the formation of the club in 1997. This is a list of seasons played by the club in English football.

Seasons

Notes

References

External links
Hinckley United official website
Hinckley United independent website

Seasons
Hinckley United